Pierre Gaspard (born 6 December 1959) is a Belgian physicist and professor at the Interdisciplinary Center for Nonlinear Phenomena and Complex Systems and the Service de Physique Non-Linéaire and Mécanique Statistique of the Universite Libre de Bruxelles (ULB). His research interests are on nonlinear physics, statistical physics, and chemical physics.

After postdoctoral studies at the University of Chicago he became a researcher with the National Fund for Scientific Research in 1989. He joined ULB as a lecturer in 1996; in 2004 he became a professor and gave up his researcher position.

He won the Théophile De Donder Prize of the Royal Academy of Science, Letters and Fine Arts of Belgium in 1988 and the Adolphe Wetrems Prize in 1995.
In 2006, he was awarded the Francqui Prize on Exact Sciences for his work on statistical mechanics. He has been a member of the Royal Academy of Science, Letters and Fine Arts of Belgium since 2006.

References

External links
 Pierre Gaspard

Belgian physicists
Living people
Academic staff of the Université libre de Bruxelles
1959 births
Scientists from Brussels
Université libre de Bruxelles alumni